Anand Gopal Mahindra (born 1 May 1955) is an Indian billionaire businessman, and the chairman of Mahindra Group, a Mumbai-based business conglomerate. The group operates in aerospace, agribusiness, aftermarket, automotive, components, construction equipment, defence, energy, farm equipment, finance and insurance, industrial equipment, information technology, leisure and hospitality, logistics, real estate and retail. Mahindra is the grandson of Jagdish Chandra Mahindra, co-founder of Mahindra & Mahindra.

As of 2023, his net worth according to Forbes was estimated to be $2.1 billion. He is an alumnus of Harvard University and Harvard Business School. In 1996, he established Nanhi Kali, a non-government organisation that supports education for underprivileged girls in India.

He is included by Fortune Magazine among the 'World's 50 Greatest Leaders'. and was in the magazine's 2011 listing of Asia's 25 most powerful businesspeople. Anand was noted by Forbes (India) as their 'Entrepreneur of the Year' for 2013. He was given the Padma Bhushan Award, the third Highest civilian award in India, in January 2020.

Early life

Anand Mahindra was born on 1 May 1955 in Bombay, India to the late industrialist Harish Mahindra and Indira Mahindra. Anand has two sisters; Anuja Sharma and Radhika Nath. He completed his early schooling from Lawrence School, Lovedale and then went on to study film making and architecture from Harvard University where he graduated magna cum laude in 1977. In 1981, he completed his MBA from the Harvard Business School

Career
In 1981, Anand joined Mahindra Ugine Steel Company Ltd (MUSCO) as an Executive Assistant to the Finance Director.

In 1989 he was appointed as President and Deputy Managing Director of the MUSCO. he initiated the Mahindra Group's diversification into the new business areas of real estate development and hospitality management.

On 4 April 1991, he took the role of Deputy Managing Director of Mahindra & Mahindra Ltd., a producer of off-road vehicles and agricultural tractors in India. 
In April 1997, Anand was appointed as the Managing Director and then in 2001 as the Vice Chairman of Mahindra & Mahindra Ltd.

In August 2012, he took on the role of Chairman of the board and Managing Director of the Mahindra Group from his uncle, Keshub Mahindra.

In November 2016, Anand was re-designated as Executive Chairman of Mahindra & Mahindra Ltd and continued to be the Chairman of Mahindra Group.

Anand was a co-promoter of Kotak Mahindra Bank (formally known as Kotak Mahindra Finance Ltd,.) In 2013, he ceased to be a promoter and stayed on as a non-executive director.

Today, the Mahindra Group is a US$19 billion organisation, and one of India's top 10 industrial houses.
 
Anand Mahindra has been tagged as the face of Indian capitalism by The Economist. Forbes India Magazine has recognised him as their 'Entrepreneur of the Year' for the year 2013.

Beyond Mahindra
In April 2014, Anand became a member of the board of U.S.–India Business Council (USIBC). He helps promote the policy advocacy priorities of USIBC and advises members and senior USIBC staff.

In 2011, Anand was invited to join the International Advisory Council of Singapore's Economic Development Board.

He is the Chairman of the India Advisory Council at the Lincoln Center, New York. In January 2015, he was appointed on a four-year team as a Trustee of the Natural History Museum of London.

An avid advocate of using 'design for human happiness', Anand is the chairman, Governing Council National Institute of Design and President, India Design Council.

In 2014, Anand Mahindra with his brother-in-law and sports commentator, Charu Sharma, launched Pro Kabaddi League, a professional-level kabaddi league in India.

Anand, along with Mukesh Ambani and Mahesh Samat, was the co-founder EPIC, an Indian television channel in 2014 that showcases Hindi content. In 2016, he became the sole owner after both the co-founders sold their stakes to Mahindra.

Anand was featured in Fortune Magazine's list of The World's 50 Greatest Leaders in 2014 and in the list of the top 25 most powerful business people in Asia in 2011. He was the World Economic Forum co-chairman in 2009. He was one of the contributors for the book 'Reimagining India' published by Mckinsey & Company. In 2003, he was elected as the president of the Confederation of Indian Industry.

Other boards and committees
Anand also serves on:
 Harvard Business School – Asia–Pacific Advisory Board
 Harvard University Asia Centre – Advisory Committee
 Harvard Global Advisory Council
 Asia Business Council
 Global Board of Advisers of the Council on Foreign Relations
 World Bank Group's Advisory Board for Doing Business
 Board member of Mumbai Academy of the Moving Image

Honors and awards 
Over the years, Anand has received several recognitions including:
 Rajiv Gandhi Award for outstanding contribution in the business field – 2004 
 Knight of the Order of Merit’ by the President of the French Republic – 2004  
 Leadership Award – American India Foundation – 2005  
 Business Leader Award for the year award – CNBC Asia – 2006 
 Harvard Business School Alumni Achievement Award – 2008 
 Ernst & Young Entrepreneur of the Year India award – 2009 
 Business India Businessman of the Year award – 2007 
 Business Leader of the Year – The Asian Awards – 2011 
 Global Leadership Award – US-India Business Council – 2012  
 Best Transformational Leader Award – Asian Centre For Corporate Governance & Sustainability – 2012 
 Entrepreneur for the Year – Forbes India Leadership Awards – 2013 
 Sustainable Development Leadership Award – The Energy and Resources Institute (TERI) – 2014 
 Business Today CEO of the Year - 2014 
 ‘Social Media Person of the Year’ by the Internet and Mobile Association of India - 2016 
 ‘Disruptor Personality of the Year Award’ by Bloomberg TV India - 2016 
 Harvard Medal - Harvard Alumni Association - 2014 
 Chevalier de l’Ordre national la Légion d’Honneur - French Republic - 2016 
 Top 30 CEOs worldwide - Barron's List - 2016
 Padma Bhushan Award - 2020
 USISPF Leadership Award - 2020

Personal life 
Anand married Anuradha, who was a journalist and later launched the magazine, Verve. She is currently the editor of magazines Verve and Man's World. They have two daughters, Divya and Aalika.

Anand has a keen interest in film making, a subject he pursued as an undergraduate at Harvard. He is a keen photographer with a strong interest in films. He also enjoys listening to the blues and has set up Mahindra Blues Festival held annually in Mumbai since 2011.

Anand promotes arts & culture and has set up an awards platform named Mahindra Excellence in Theater Awards and the Mahindra Sanatkada Lucknow Festival, a crafts exhibition and performing arts event held annually in Lucknow.

Charity
Anand is an advocate of the study of humanities as he believes it can help address various problems in the world that arise due to interdependency. He donated $10 million to support the Harvard Humanities Center. In recognition of this donation, the center was renamed to Mahindra Humanities Center at Harvard.

He is the founder of project Nanhi Kali which aims to provide primary education to underprivileged girls in India. As of September 2017, the project has supported 130,000 underprivileged girls.

Anand is also the chairman-for-life and one of the board of directors of Naandi Foundation, an Indian charitable trust that works towards the socio-economic development of India.

References

External links 

 CNN on Anand
 Anand Mahindra Business India's Business Man of the Year 2007
 Anand on CNN Talk Asia
 NSC Chairman Profile 
 Building a Knowledge Economy on Growth 

Recipients of the Padma Bhushan in trade and industry
1955 births
Living people
Businesspeople from Mumbai
People in the automobile industry
Mahindra Group
Harvard Business School alumni
Formula E team owners
Indian billionaires
Harvard University alumni